Andreyevka is an urban locality (urban-type settlement) in Solnechnogorsky District of Moscow Oblast, Russia. Population:

References

Notes

Sources

Urban-type settlements in Moscow Oblast
Solnechnogorsky District